A Schedule F appointment was a job classification in the excepted service of the United States federal civil service that existed briefly at the end of the Trump administration during 2020–2021. It would have contained policy-related positions, removing their civil service protections and making them easy to fire. It was never fully implemented, and no one was appointed to it before it was repealed at the beginning of the Biden administration.

The purpose of the provision was to increase the President's control over the federal career civil service. While proponents stated this would increase flexibility and accountability, it was widely criticized as providing means to retaliate against federal officials for political reasons. It was estimated that tens or hundreds of thousands of career employees could have lost their civil service protections, increasing the number of political appointments by a factor of ten.

Characteristics 
The legal basis for the Schedule F appointment was a section of the Civil Service Reform Act of 1978, which exempts from civil service protections federal employees "whose position has been determined to be of a confidential, policy-determining, policy-making or policy-advocating character". The provision had been little noticed and unused before its application by the Schedule F order.

The stated purpose of the order was to increase flexibility in hiring and firing to improve performance management and accountability. The Civil Service Rules and Regulations would not have covered employees within the Schedule F classification, including due process and possibly collective bargaining rights. However, appointees could not have been fired based on certain protected statuses, such as whistleblower status, partisan affiliation, or for claiming discrimination or harassment. The Executive Order also provided transition procedures for transferring covered positions out of the competitive service into Schedule F, by which executive agency heads must petition the Director of the OPM with a list of positions to be converted with a written rationale. The OPM Director had the sole power to decide whether to grant the petition.

The Schedule F classification included "positions of a confidential, policy-determining, policy-making, or policy-advocating character not normally subject to change as a result of a Presidential transition". The Executive Order listed several characteristics of jobs that may fall under the Schedule F classification:

 substantive participation in advocacy, development, or formulation of policy, especially of regulations and guidance
substantive policy-related work in an agency or component that primarily focuses on policy
 the supervision of attorneys
 substantial discretion to determine how the agency exercises functions committed to it by law
 working with non-public policy proposals or deliberations generally covered by deliberative process privilege, and either:
directly reporting to or regularly working with an individual appointed by either the President, or by an agency head paid at the GS-13 level or higher, or
working in the executive secretariat of the agency or component
 conducting certain collective bargaining negotiations on the agency's behalf

According to the Office of Personnel Management (OPM), these provisions were guidelines, as not all positions covered by them were required to be converted to Schedule F, and positions not covered by them may have been converted. The provisions were broad enough to include many scientists, attorneys, regulators, public health experts, and others in senior roles. The estimated number of employees they covered ranged from tens of thousands to hundreds of thousands.

History

Planning 
According to reporting by Axios, the idea for the Schedule F appointment was devised by James Sherk, a member of the advisory Domestic Policy Council who was seeking ways to prevent career civil service employees from resisting President Trump's agenda. In January 2019, while searching through Title 5 of the United States Code, which contains provisions on civil service protections, he came across , and brought it to the attention of the White House Counsel's Office.

The executive order was drafted secretly over the following months and was completed by late spring of 2019. However, due to large agency workloads, it was decided to delay issuing it until 2020, which was further delayed by the COVID-19 pandemic. Trump was reportedly motivated by a desire to get even with recalcitrant officials after his first impeachment trial, which concluded in February 2020.

Implementation 
Schedule F was created by Executive Order 13957 on October 21, 2020 during the Trump administration.

Heads of all federal agencies were ordered to submit a list of positions that could be reclassified as Schedule F. The lists were to be submitted by January 19, 2021, the day before the next presidential inauguration, to John D. McEntee, the Director of the Presidential Personnel Office.

In November 2020, the Office of Management and Budget classified 88% of that agency's workforce, 425 employees, to be converted to Schedule F.  At the time of the executive order's repeal, the Office of Personnel Management had approved most of these reclassifications, and some other agencies had also submitted their reclassification proposals.

Repeal 
It was repealed by President Biden through Executive Order 14003 on January 22, 2021, the third day of his administration, by executive order.  No employees had been moved to the new classification.

Response 
The creation of Schedule F was controversial, as it is estimated that tens or hundreds of thousands of career employees could lose their civil service protections, and that it would increase the number of political appointments by a factor of ten.  Conversely, there was concern that political appointees of Trump, whose appointments are supposed to expire at the end of his term, could "burrow in" by being converted to Schedule F appointments that are harder to fire.

Eleanor Mueller, a writer for Politico, wrote that the executive order "stripped job protections for many federal workers" by requiring federal agencies to classify "any worker responsible for the handling of policy" into a new category that would be exempt from hiring and firing protections and ineligible for representation as part of a union bargaining unit, and "would make it easier to remove civil servants who do not agree with the administration's policies" while easing the potential transition of current political appointees into permanent civil service jobs. Rebecca Beitsch, writing for The Hill, wrote that unions were criticizing Trump's executive order as "the biggest change to federal workforce protections in a century, converting many federal workers to 'at will' employment". Eric Yoder, a Washington Post journalist, said the order "could affect tens of thousands or more career positions involved in making or carrying out policy".

An official statement from Infectious Diseases Society of America (IDSA) further stated that the executive order was "alarming". The six authors, all infectious disease specialists, and epidemiologists, wrote:
We rely on the judgment of civil service experts to lead responses against the pandemic, inform the public, drive research, update guidance and review data supporting the use and distribution of vaccines and treatments to address the impacts of COVID-19. Replacing our scientists and public health experts with politically motivated staff will reduce our ability to respond, and reduce public confidence in our response, to COVID-19 and other public health crises.

The executive order received support from conservatives. Rachel Greszler, a fellow at The Heritage Foundation, said: "I really think that the order is unlikely to affect many of those workers because the overwhelming majority of federal employees are upstanding individuals, they're providing valuable knowledge and experience that the managers in the agency heads don't want to lose. It's only those bad apples who are derelict in their duties, or they're outright trying to thwart their agency’s actions that would need to worry about their job security".

Congress 
House Democrats introduced a bill in the 116th Congress, the Saving the Civil Service Act, that would halt the executive order's implementation and restore any converted or fired Schedule F appointees back into competitive service positions.  There was also discussion of adding the same provisions to either the National Defense Authorization Act for Fiscal Year 2021 or a continuing resolution for fiscal year 2021 appropriations. A coalition of 28 labor unions supported these provisions.  However, no provision regarding Schedule F was included in the Consolidated Appropriations Act, 2021.

House Democrats also requested documents about the creation of the executive order.

Representative Don Beyer (D-VA) said, "it's an attempt to redefine the civil service as a political arm of the presidency rather than public servants who work for the American people", leading to "open cronyism that does not benefit the country, but the president".  Former federal human resources executive Jeff Neal called the order "the most direct assault on the career civil service since the passage of the Pendleton Act in 1883", which had created the merit-based federal civil service.

Representative James Comer (R-KY) supported the change, saying that “our founding fathers never envisioned a massive unelected, unaccountable federal government with the power to create policies that impact Americans' everyday lives... President Trump has long pledged to take on this bureaucracy and restore power to the people by draining the swamp".

Resignation of Ronald Sanders 
On October 26, 2020, Ronald Sanders, the chair of the Federal Salary Council, resigned. Writing that he was a "lifelong Republican" who prided himself on having "served three Democratic and three Republican presidents", Sanders sent a letter to John D. McEntee, Presidential Personnel Office director, characterizing Executive Order 13957, which had purported to hold federal employees more accountable, as a transparent attempt to remove long-standing employment protections from federal workers:
On its surface, the president's Executive Order purports to serve a legitimate and laudable purpose...that is, to hold career Federal employees 'more accountable' for their performance. That is something that I have spent most of my professional life — almost four decades in Federal service (over 20 as a member of the Senior Executive Service) — trying to do. However, it is clear that its stated purpose notwithstanding, the Executive Order is nothing more than a smokescreen for what is clearly an attempt to require the political loyalty of those who advise the President, or failing that, to enable their removal with little if any due process... I simply cannot be part of an Administration that seeks...to replace apolitical expertise with political obeisance. Career Federal employees are legally and duty-bound to be nonpartisan; they take an oath to preserve and protect our Constitution and the rule of law...not to be loyal to a particular President or Administration.

Lawsuit
The National Treasury Employees Union sued the administration in the United States District Court for the District of Columbia over the executive order, arguing that the administration did not properly justify it satisfied the legal requirement that the changes are "necessary" and as "conditions of good administration warrant".

Later developments 
In mid-2022, it was reported that Trump and his allies planned to reinstate the Schedule F provisions if he were elected to a second term, including identifying around 50,000 workers who could be reclassified.

The Preventing a Patronage System Act was introduced at the beginning of the 117th Congress by Democrat Gerry Connolly of Virginia.  It was passed by the House in July 2022 as part of its version of the National Defense Authorization Act for Fiscal Year 2023.  However, it was removed from the final bill passed in December 2022.

See also
 Presidency of Donald Trump
 The Fifth Risk - a book documenting political appointments at the beginning of the Trump presidency
 Spoils system

References 

Civil service in the United States
Executive orders of Donald Trump
Trump administration controversies